Idiomarina planktonica is a Gram-negative and non-spore-forming bacterium from the genus of Idiomarina which has been isolated from the Tuosu lake in China.

References

Bacteria described in 2014
Alteromonadales